...Twice Shy is the fourth studio album released by the American glam metal band Great White. It was released in 1989 and contained the biggest hits of their career, a cover of Ian Hunter's "Once Bitten, Twice Shy" and "The Angel Song", which reached No. 5 and No. 30 on the Billboard Hot 100, respectively. Another single, "House of Broken Love", was inspired by the painful relationship break-ups that vocalist Jack Russell and guitarist Mark Kendall had recently gone through. The album was certified Double Platinum in September 1989. The first album to feature bassist Tony Montana.

Critical reception

David Spodek, reviewer of RPM, complained about the lack of originality. As per him "the main problem is that the original material is missing that something special to distinguish it from the rest of the heavy metal crop, and that may result in getting lost in the crowd". As a result Spodek called it "just another heavy metal album" and regretfully stated that the best cut on the album is a cover of Ian Hunter's "Once Bitten, Twice Shy."

Album cover
The bodies of the ladies displayed on the album cover belong to models (from left to right): Bobbie Brown who also appeared in the video for "Once Bitten, Twice Shy" and Tracy Martinson who was featured on the front cover of their previous album: Once Bitten.

Track listing

Personnel

Great White
Jack Russell – vocals
Mark Kendall – guitar, backing vocals
Michael Lardie – guitar, keyboards, backing vocals, producer, engineer, arrangements
Tony Montana – bass guitar
Audie Desbrow – drums

Production
Alan Niven – producer, arrangements
Michael Lardie  - producer
Eddie Ashworth – engineer
Melissa Sewell – assistant engineer
George Marino – mastering

Charts

Weekly charts

Year-end charts

Singles

Once Bitten, Twice Shy

The Angel Song

Mista Bone

Heart the Hunter

House of Broken Love

Certifications

...Twice Shy / Live at the Marquee

Capitol UK, Electrola West Germany released a limited edition version of ...Twice Shy as a double CD and LP set. The second disc was titled Live at The Marquee, and included a full live album recorded on December 18, 1987.

Live at The Marquee track listing
 "Shot in the Dark"
 "What Do You Do"
 "Gonna Getcha"
 "Money (That's What I Want)"
 "All Over Now"
 "Is Anybody There?"
 "Face the Day"
 "Rock Me"

References

Great White albums
1989 albums
Capitol Records albums
1989 live albums
Capitol Records live albums
Great White live albums